An annular solar eclipse will occur on December 16, 2085. A solar eclipse occurs when the Moon passes between Earth and the Sun, thereby totally or partly obscuring the image of the Sun for a viewer on Earth. An annular solar eclipse occurs when the Moon's apparent diameter is smaller than the Sun's, blocking most of the Sun's light and causing the Sun to look like an annulus (ring). An annular eclipse appears as a partial eclipse over a region of the Earth thousands of kilometres wide. If a moon with same apparent diameter in this eclipse near the Aphelion, it will be Total Solar Eclipse, but in this time of the year, just 2 weeks and 4 days (18 days) before perihelion, it is an Annular Solar Eclipse.

Related eclipses

Solar eclipses 2083–2087

Saros 143

Notes

References 

2085 12 16
2085 12 16
2085 12 16
2085 in science